The Indian Psychiatric Society (IPS) is the main professional organization of psychiatrists in India. It was founded in 1929 under the banner of the Royal Medico Psychological Association. Its current president is Dr. N.N. Raju.

Founding 

The organisation holds its origins in 1929, when Berkeley Hill founded the Indian Association for Mental Hygiene. In 1935, the Indian division of the Royal Medico Psychological Association was formed due to the efforts of Banarasi Das. In 1946, Dr. Nagendra Nath De consulted Major R. B. Davis of the Hospital for Mental Disease, Kanke, Ranchi, and Brigadier Thomas Arthur Munro, Advisor in Psychiatry to the Indian Army, decided to revive the association. Due to their efforts, the Indian Psychiatric Society was inaugurated.

Indian Journal of Psychiatry 
The IPS operates the Indian Journal of Psychiatry, whose chief editor is Dr. Om Prakash Singh. It has once discussed the widely held practice of covert medication in its July 2012 issue of its publication due to the effort of Anirudh Kala.

Overview & Objectives
IPS is the largest professional body of psychiatry in India, whose stated aims are to:
promote and advance the subject of Psychiatry and allied sciences in all their different branches, 
promote the improvement of the mental health of the people and mental health education, promote prevention, control, treatment and relief of all psychiatric disabilities, formulate and 
advise on the standards of education and training for medical and auxiliary personnel in psychiatry and to recommend adequate teaching facilities for the purpose, 
promote research in the field of psychiatry and mental health, propagate the principles of psychiatry and current development in psychiatric thought, 
deals with any matter relating to mental health concerning the country and 
to do all other things as are cognate to the subjects of the Indian Psychiatric Society, *safeguard the interest of psychiatrists and fellow professionals in India and 
promote ethical standards in the practice of psychiatry in India

Publication
The Indian Psychiatric Society publishes its own journal, Indian Journal of Psychiatry.

Controversies 
In 2013, it was reported that the then-incoming president of IPS, Indira Sharmam had delivered a speech which recommended marrying off men at a younger age to prevent sexual crimes against women. Subsequently, it was also reported that high-ranking IPS officials were ordering IPS members to abstain from communicating with media houses to prevent any further controversy and negative press. The IPS officials also convened a meeting to discuss whether to publish her speech on the IPS website, or to censor the controversial sections.

At the January 2014 annual meeting of the Indian Psychiatric Society, and in subsequent remarks to the press, Dr. Sharma, then the Immediate Past President, engendered even more controversy by stating that homosexuality was unnatural, homosexuals can be cured, and that by talking openly about sex homosexuals were making everyone else uncomfortable. Dr. A.K. Kala, a senior member and Chairperson of Mental Health Legislation Committee requested the IPS President to post the official position of the IPS about homosexuality on its website. When that did not happen, Dr. Kala resigned from the membership of IPS, possibly the only Psychiatrist to have ever done so.

Ambassadors 
Deepika Padukone is the brand ambassador for the Indian Psychiatric Society.

See also

 P. C. Shastri, former President of the IPS
 Pakistan Psychiatric Society

References

External links
 Indian Psychiatric Society
 Indian Journal of Psychiatry
  Indian Psychiatric Society - Tamil Nadu Chapter
 27 th annual state conference at thanjavur

Mental health organisations in India
Psychiatric associations
1929 establishments in India
Organizations established in 1929